Sinister Street  is a British television series which originally aired on BBC in six episodes between 10 May and 14 June 1969. It is based on the 1913 novel of the same title by Compton Mackenzie.

The cast included Jo Kendall, Kate Lansbury, David Collings, Jeanne Moody, Michael Osborne, Valerie Gearon, Joan Hickson, Elaine Taylor, Angela Baddeley, Arthur Hewlett and Jo Rowbottom.

The only televised adaptation produced, all six episodes were wiped, and are believed to be lost.

References

Bibliography
 Philip Waller. Writers, Readers, and Reputations: Literary Life in Britain 1870-1918. Oxford University Press, 2008.

External links
 

BBC television dramas
Television shows set in London
1969 British television series debuts
1960s British drama television series
English-language television shows
Television shows based on British novels